Onye Ozi is a 2013 Nigerian comedy film directed by Obi Emelonye. The film won two category awards at the 2014 Nollywood Movies Awards.

Background and production
Onye Ozi was shot in London and was premiered on 18 October 2013 at The Lighthouse Hall, Camberwell, London. It was produced by Obi Emelonye and Emmanuella Ngozi Ideh with support from Nollywood Movies, London, Screen Nation Pictures and M-Net.

Critical reception
Since it debuted in 2013, Onye Ozi has won multiple awards locally and internationally. Upon its release, Onye Ozi was met with mixed reviews. Sodas & Popcorn, a Nigerian movie blog through BellaNaija cited flaws in the film and further criticized Obi Emelonye's film writing technique stating that, "My issue with his movies have always been the writing. The stories never seem to add up and take he most awkward turns and twists." YNaija's Wilfred Okichie also gave the film a low rating describing it as an "ultra-low budget independent film".

Cast
Okey Bakassi as Metumaribe Onuigbo
Anthony Aclet as Chike
Stephen Moriaty as TJ
Ngozi Igwebike as Mkpurunma
Adesua Atuanya as Adaaugo
D'Kachy Obi-Emelonye as Ossy
Chinemerem Okemuo as Ogbenyealu
Frank Ani as Ofoegbu
Nkiruka Emelonye as Uju
King Onuigbo as Father

Awards and nominations

References

External links 
 
 

2013 films
Films directed by Obi Emelonye
Nigerian comedy films